The 1942 Georgia Bulldogs football team was an American football team that represented the University of Georgia in the Southeastern Conference (SEC) during the 1942 college football season. In their fourth season under head coach Wally Butts, the Bulldogs compiled an 11–1 record, shut out six of twelve opponents (including a 34–0 victory over No. 2 Georgia Tech), won the SEC championship, and outscored all opponents by a total of 378 to 73. The Bulldogs' 75–0 win over Florida remains the largest margin of victory in the history of the Florida–Georgia football rivalry. 

In the final AP Poll released on November 30, 1942, Georgia was ranked No. 2 with 1,339 points, less than 100 points behind No. 1 Ohio State. After the final AP Poll, the Bulldogs defeated No. 13 UCLA in the 1943 Rose Bowl. Ohio State did not play in a bowl game. In this time period, the AP did not conduct polling after the bowl games. However, in later analysis, Georgia was selected as the 1942 national champion by the majority of selectors, including Berryman (QPRS), Billingsley Report, DeVold System, Houlgate System, Litkenhous, Poling System, Sagarin Ratings, and Williamson System. Georgia retroactively claimed the title in the late 1980s, after then-head coach and athletic director Vince Dooley discovered that the team was listed as a national champion in an NCAA record book.

At the end of the 1942 season, Georgia halfback Frank Sinkwich won the Heisman Trophy. He was also selected as SEC Player of the Year, Associated Press Athlete of the Year, and a consensus first-team pick on the 1942 All-America college football team. Several Georgia players also received first-team honors from the Associated Press (AP) and/or United Press (UP) on the 1942 All-SEC football team: Sinkwich (AP-1, UP-1); end George Poschner (AP-1, UP-1); and guard Walter Ruark (AP-1, UP-2).

Schedule

References

Georgia
Georgia Bulldogs football seasons
College football national champions
Southeastern Conference football champion seasons
Rose Bowl champion seasons
Georgia Bulldogs football